Nolan MacMillan (born December 21, 1990) is a former professional Canadian football offensive lineman who played in seven seasons for the Ottawa Redblacks of the Canadian Football League (CFL). He is a Grey Cup champion after winning with the Redblacks in 2016 and was named a CFL East Division All-Star in 2019.

High school
MacMillan attended St. Michael's College School in Toronto. He attended the Hun School of Princeton in New Jersey as a senior.

College career
MacMillan played college football for the Iowa Hawkeyes from 2010 to 2013 while using a redshirt season in 2009.

Professional career
MacMillan was drafted ninth overall in the 2013 CFL Draft by the Ottawa Redblacks and was the first player ever to be drafted by the team. After completing his college eligibility, MacMillan signed with the Redblacks on May 28, 2014. He became a free agent upon the expiry of his contract on February 8, 2022. He announced his retirement on August 5, 2022, and finished his career having played in 87 games and three Grey Cups, including the championship win in 2016.

Personal life
MacMillan was born in Arnprior to parents Janet and Paul MacMillan.

References

External links
Ottawa Redblacks bio

1990 births
Living people
Canadian football offensive linemen
People from Arnprior, Ontario
Players of Canadian football from Ontario
Iowa Hawkeyes football players
Ottawa Redblacks players